Yu Zhigang (May 1973 – 3 May 2022) was a Chinese politician. A member of the Chinese Communist Party, he served on the Standing Committee of the National People's Congress from 2018 to 2021. He died of a cerebral hemorrhage in Shenyang on 3 May 2022 at the age of 48.

References

1973 births
2022 deaths
21st-century Chinese politicians
Chinese Communist Party politicians from Henan
Academic staff of China University of Political Science and Law
Members of the Standing Committee of the 13th National People's Congress
Politicians from Luoyang
Renmin University of China alumni